Tchakala Tchanilé (born 30 March 1969) is a Togolese football coach and former player who managed the Togo national team.

Playing career
Tchanilé played in Germany between 1992 and 1995.

He represented Togo at senior international level, appearing in FIFA World Cup qualifying matches.

Coaching career
Tchanilé earned his coaching badges while living in Germany.

He coached a number of club sides, including Maranatha and Dyto (both of Togo), as well as Nigerien team JST Niamey.

He was appointed as the head coach of Togo in June 2014 on a six-month contract, succeeding Frenchman Didier Six, whom he had previously assisted in the role.

Personal life
He is the younger brother of Bana Tchanilé.

References

Living people
1969 births
Togolese footballers
Association football midfielders
Togo international footballers
SG Bergmann-Borsig players
Togolese football managers
Togo national football team managers
Togolese expatriate footballers
Togolese expatriate sportspeople in Germany
Expatriate footballers in Germany
Togolese expatriate sportspeople in Niger
Expatriate footballers in Niger
21st-century Togolese people